Anija Parish is a rural municipality in Harju County, Estonia, consisting of 33 settlements.

The administrative centre of the municipality is Kehra. The municipality also has an office in the borough of Aegviidu.

Anija Parish is bordered by Kuusalu, Jõelähtme, Raasiku, Kose parishes in Harju County, Järva parish in Järva County and Tapa Parish in Lääne-Viru County.

History 
Anija Village (Hangægus) was first mentioned in the Danish Census Book in 1241.

Anija Manor, the namesake of Anija Parish, was first mentioned in 1482.

Anija Parish was first created in the 19th century as part of the bigger, now arhaic Harju-Jaani Parish.

In 1939, Anija Parish ceded Aavere, Pillapalu and gained Alavere Parish, Paasiku, and parts of Kiviloo.

In 1945, Anija, Kehra and Pikva Rural Councils were created on the lands of Anija Parish.

In 1950, Anija Parish was abolished, effectively being replaced by the three rural councils.

In 1992, a new Anija Parish was created, which had the same borders as the preceding Anija Rural Council.

In 2002, the town of Kehra was merged with Anija Parish.

In 2017, the borough of Aegviidu was merged with Anija Parish.

Population

Religion

Gallery

References

External links
Official website (available only in Estonian)

 
Municipalities of Estonia